Mario Behrendt (born 9 September 1960) is an East German boxer. He competed in the men's bantamweight event at the 1980 Summer Olympics. At the 1980 Summer Olympics, he lost to Dumitru Cipere of Romania.

References

1960 births
Living people
German male boxers
Olympic boxers of East Germany
Boxers at the 1980 Summer Olympics
Boxers from Berlin
Bantamweight boxers